Habraão Lincon do Nascimento Saraiva (born 26 June 2001), simply known as Habraão, is a Brazilian professional footballer who plays as a central defender for Fortaleza.

Club career
Born in Além Paraíba, Minas Gerais, Habraão joined Flamengo's youth setup in March 2019, on loan from Primavera. Released nearly one year later, he moved to Coritiba also in a temporary deal, but was also released in February 2021.

On 13 March 2021, still owned by Primavera, Habraão signed for Fortaleza and was initially assigned to the under-20s. He was promoted to the first team in January 2022, and signed a permanent three-year contract on 10 February, as the club paid R$ 200,000 for 50% of his economic rights.

Habraão made his senior debut with the Leão do Pici on 22 June 2022, coming on as a late substitute for Moisés in a 2–0 home win over rivals Ceará, for the year's Copa do Brasil. On his Série A debut on 3 July, he scored the equalizer in a 2–1 away loss against Coritiba.

Career statistics

Honours
Fortaleza
Copa do Nordeste: 2022
Campeonato Cearense: 2022

References

External links
Fortaleza profile 

2001 births
Living people
Sportspeople from Minas Gerais
Brazilian footballers
Association football defenders
Campeonato Brasileiro Série A players
Fortaleza Esporte Clube players